Ljiljana Vučević, née Mugoša (born April 10, 1962 in Podgorica, Montenegro), is a former Yugoslav handball player who competed in the 1984 Summer Olympics and in the 1988 Summer Olympics.

In 1984, she was a member of the Yugoslav handball team which won the gold medal. She played four matches and scored four goals.

Four years later she was part of the Yugoslav team which finished fourth. She played all five matches and scored five goals.

External links
profile

1962 births
Living people
Sportspeople from Podgorica
Yugoslav female handball players
Montenegrin female handball players
Handball players at the 1984 Summer Olympics
Handball players at the 1988 Summer Olympics
Olympic handball players of Yugoslavia
Olympic gold medalists for Yugoslavia
Olympic medalists in handball
Medalists at the 1984 Summer Olympics